The Réunion Open is an open international badminton tournament in Réunion. It was the highest international championships in Réunion. The event is part of the Badminton World Federation's International Challenge and part of the Badminton Confederation of Africa's circuit. The inaugural edition was held in 2022.

Winners

Performances by nation

References 

Badminton tournaments in Réunion
Sports competitions in Réunion
Sport in Saint-Denis, Réunion